Clyde Duane Wardlow (July 2, 1932  – August 7, 2017) was a former American football player who played for Los Angeles Rams of the National Football League (NFL). He played college football at the University of Washington.

References

1932 births
2017 deaths
American football defensive ends
Washington Huskies football players
Los Angeles Rams players